The 2021 Tripoli protests are riots, civil disobedience, civil disorder and demonstrations after the government of Hassan Diab announced a nationwide lockdown, amid hunger, inflation and unemployment increasing, worsening the already deteriorating economy. According to Al Jazeera English, protesters rallied for their third consecutive night in Tripoli as it turned into riots. Police fired live ammunition to disperse protesters. Many people were left wounded in the clashes. Protests occurred during nights in 25-26 January, when the military fired live rounds, rubber bullets and tear gas. At least 60 people and 10 security forces were wounded in the clashes. A protester died in the clashes.

See also
 2019–2021 Lebanese protests

References

2021 in Lebanon
2021 protests
2021 riots
2021 protests
January 2021 crimes in Asia
Protests in Lebanon
Riots and civil disorder in Lebanon